Shmuel Sambursky, or Samuel Sambursky (1900-1990) Hebrew: שמואל סמבורסקי was a German, Palestinian, and Israeli physicist, professor, and author during the respective epochs of his country —Germany, Mandatory Palestine, and Israel.

Sambursky was born in Königsberg, Germany 30 October 1900. Educated in Germany, Dr. Sambursky emigrated to Palestine in 1924. He joined the physics faculty at The Hebrew University in Jerusalem in 1928, where he was a popular lecturer due to his sense of history and humorous lecture style.

As the Executive Secretary of the Board of Scientific and Industrial Research, which was established in 1945 by the Mandatory government, Sambursky remained at this institution, as the first director, when it became the Research Council of Israel, established in 1949. Remaining the Vice Chairman of the Research Council in 1957, Sambursky became dean of The Hebrew University's faculty of science, and in 1959 became professor of its department of the history and philosophy of science.

Sambursky served UNESCO from 1952 through 1954.
Professor Sambursky was author and editor of multiple monographs on the history and philosophy of science, for classical antiquity.

In 1968 he received the Israel Prize for Humanities.
Sambursky died 18 May 1990 in Jerusalem. He is buried in Har HaMenuchot.

References

Israeli physicists
Scientists from Königsberg
1900 births
1990 deaths
German emigrants to Mandatory Palestine
Academic staff of the Hebrew University of Jerusalem